Rose Hawthorne Lathrop, also known as Mother Mary Alphonsa, (May 20, 1851 – July 9, 1926) was an American writer and religious leader. She was a Catholic religious sister, social worker, and foundress of the Dominican Sisters of Hawthorne.

Early life and education
Rose Hawthorne was born on May 20, 1851, in Lenox, Massachusetts, to Nathaniel Hawthorne and his wife Sophia Peabody. Sophia was assisted in the birth by her father, Nathaniel Peabody. Hawthorne wrote about the infant Rose to his friend, Horatio Bridge, comparing her birth to the publication of a book: "Mrs. Hawthorne published a little work, two months ago, which still lies in sheets; but, I assure you, it makes some noise in the world, both by day and night. In plain English, we have another little red-headed daughter—a very bright, strong, and healthy imp, but, at present, with no pretentions to beauty." Rose Hawthorne and her siblings were raised in a positive environment and their parents did not believe in harsh discipline or physical punishment.

On July 28, 1851, Sophia took Hawthorne and her older sister, Una, to visit relatives in West Newton, Massachusetts. Growing up, Rose lived in Massachusetts, Liverpool, London, Paris, Rome, and Florence. The family returned to Concord, Massachusetts, in 1860. There, her older brother Julian was enrolled in a co-educational school run by Franklin Benjamin Sanborn. Though their friend, the poet Ellery Channing, recommended the Hawthorne girls attend the same school, neither was enrolled. Sophia wrote: "We entirely disapprove of this commingling of youths and maidens at the electric age in school. I find no end of ill effect from it, and this is why I do not send Una and Rose to your school." Two years after Nathaniel's death in 1864, Hawthorne was enrolled at a boarding school run by Diocletian Lewis in nearby Lexington, Massachusetts; she disliked the experience.

After Nathaniel's death, the family moved to Germany and then to England. Sophia and Una died there in 1871 and 1877, respectively.

Marriage
Rose married author George Parsons Lathrop in 1871. Prior to the marriage, George had shown romantic interest in Hawthorne's sister Una. Their brother Julian Hawthorne used the love triangle as an inspiration for his first novel, Bressant, in 1873. In 1876, the Lathrops had a son, Francis. Rose Hawthorne tried to become an author in her own right, much like her husband, father, and brother. She serialized her novel Miss Dilletante in the Boston Courier under George's editorship in 1878 and published a book of poems, Along the Shore, in 1888.

In the spring of 1879, Rose and her husband purchased her family's former home in Concord, The Wayside, with borrowed funds, where they lived until their son Francis died of diphtheria at the age of five in 1881. They returned to New York City but moved to New London, Connecticut, in 1887 for George's health. Following Francis' death George had become an alcoholic and was increasingly unstable. Una suspected he abused Rose. George also competed with Hawthorne's brother Julian for control of Nathaniel Hawthorne's legacy. In 1883, Julian planned to publish Dr. Grimshawe's Secret, a manuscript left unfinished by their father, but Rose did not believe in its existence and suspected him of forgery or perpetrating a hoax.

In New London, the Lathrops became involved with the Catholic summer school movement and collaborated on a book, A Story of Courage: A History of the Georgetown Visitation Convent. Both Hawthorne and Lathrop converted to Roman Catholicism in 1891. Though "To many of their old friends this conversion came as a shock", Hawthorne's journey to Catholicism had been years in the making.
Their travels through England, Portugal, France and Italy [had] exposed the Hawthornes to the 'Roman Church,' often misunderstood in the Protestant circles of New England … Hawthorne would write of her experience at the age of seven of seeing Pope Pius IX during Holy Week from his balcony: "I became eloquent about the Pope, and was rewarded by a gift from my mother of a little medallion of him and a gold scudo with an excellent likeness thereon, both always tenderly reverenced by me."
Nevertheless, the Lathrops' marriage continued to suffer and they separated permanently in 1896. George died of cirrhosis three years later.

Career

Hawthorne sought greater purpose in her life and spent time with the Sisters of Charity of Saint Vincent de Paul in Wellesley Hills, Massachusetts, becoming inspired by their motto, "I am for God and for the poor." She was further inspired by her relationship with Emma Lazarus, whom she befriended in 1881. After Lazarus's death from cancer at age 38, Hawthorne recalled that she was at least comfortable, unlike others who were poor. She wrote later, "Though I grieved deeply for her, I would not pity her, for she never knew unaided suffering, but every amelioration." As a source for her motivation to work with incurable impoverished people, she cited the story of a young seamstress who was too poor to afford medical treatment and instead had herself admitted to an institution for the insane on Blackwell's Island.

In the summer of 1896, Hawthorne trained as a nurse at the then–New York Cancer Hospital, the first institution in the United States to provide training in treating cancer at a time when general hospitals in the city did not admit patients with cancer. Later that year, she founded a charitable organization named after Rose of Lima, Sister Rose's Free Home, to care for impoverished cancer patients. At first, she visited patients at their homes. In October 1896, she rented three rooms in a tenement on Scammel Street on the Lower East Side, a poor immigrant neighborhood, with the help of an assistant named Alice Huber. A Dominican priest, Clement Thuente, witnessed their work in February 1899 and encouraged them to join the Dominican order as tertiaries (Third Order Dominicans).

On December 8, 1900, Hawthorne founded a new religious order, with the approval of Archbishop Michael A. Corrigan of New York. The order was named the Servants of Relief for Incurable Cancer; she became its first Mother Superior, with the name Mother Mary Alphonsa. Alice became known as Mother Rose. The order—now known as the Dominican Sisters of Hawthorne—opened a facility called St. Rose's Home on Water Street in Manhattan; it then moved to Cherry Street, before settling north of New York City in what is now Rosary Hill Home in Hawthorne.

Hawthorne's brother, Julian, considered her decision to be a martyrdom, writing, "Nothing less than the extreme would satisfy her thirst for self-sacrifice." When he was imprisoned for mail fraud, she traveled to Washington, D.C., on April 3, 1913, to ask President Woodrow Wilson to pardon him. Julian was angered by her intervention, and no pardon was granted.

Death and legacy
On July 8, 1926, Hawthorne wrote various letters asking for donations until nearly 10 o'clock before going to bed. She died in her sleep on July 9, the day that would have been her parents' 84th wedding anniversary. She was buried on the grounds of the motherhouse of the Dominican Sisters in Hawthorne, N.Y.

Hawthorne received a medal from the National Institute of Social Sciences for "notable achievement" in 1914. In 1925, she was awarded an honorary Master of Arts from Bowdoin College. On April 18, 1926, the Rotary Club of New York presented her with a service medal as "soldier of love, a friend of the poor, organizer of rare ability, hope of the hopeless".

The Rose Hawthorne Guild was established to promote her cause for canonization. In 2003, Cardinal Edward Egan, Archbishop of the Archdiocese of New York, approved the movement for Hawthorne's canonization. She now has the title "Servant of God" in the Catholic Church.

Selected works
 Miss Dilletante, 1878[9]
 Along the Shore, 1888
 A Story of Courage: A History of the Georgetown Visitation Convent
 Memories of Hawthorne

References

Sources

External links

 
 
Ibiblio: Rose Hawthorne Lathrop / Mother Alphonsa
Rosary Hill Home official website
 

1851 births
1926 deaths
19th-century American poets
19th-century American women writers
20th-century American Roman Catholic nuns
19th-century American Roman Catholic nuns
American Servants of God
American women poets
Catholics from Massachusetts
Converts to Roman Catholicism
Dominican Sisters
Founders of Catholic religious communities
People from Lenox, Massachusetts
People of the Roman Catholic Archdiocese of New York
Poets from Massachusetts
Poets from New York (state)
Religious leaders from Massachusetts
Writers from New York City